Lawrence Garfield Black (15 September 1881 – 14 August 1959) was an English cricketer. Black was a left-handed batsman who bowled left-arm medium pace.

Black made his first-class debut for Hampshire against the Gentlemen of Philadelphia in 1903. On debut, Black took his only first-class wicket, that of Philadelphia batsman John Lester.

After the First World War and sixteen years after making his debut for Hampshire, Black made his second first-class appearance for Hampshire in 1919. Black played three matches in the 1919 County Championship against Middlesex, Surrey and Yorkshire.

Black died at Dewsbury, Yorkshire on 14 August 1959.

References

External links
Lawrence Black at Cricinfo
Lawrence Black at CricketArchive

1881 births
1959 deaths
People from Lambeth
Cricketers from Greater London
English cricketers
Hampshire cricketers